Mpemba Kasi is the traditional name of a large Bantu kingdom to the south of the Mbata Kingdom, until merging with that state to form the Kingdom of Kongo around 1375 AD.

Kasi is described as a very large territory, but not as powerful. Its last ruler, according to oral tradition, was named Nimi a Nzima.

References

Kingdom of Kongo
Former countries in Africa
States and territories disestablished in 1375